A Royal Warrant of Precedence is a warrant issued by the monarch of the United Kingdom to determine precedence amongst individuals or organisations.

Most warrants of this type are issued to grant a rank to a member of the nobility or gentry that they would normally have enjoyed when their relative (usually their sibling) inherits a title, but failed to assume automatically due to such circumstances as the death of their father (see courtesy title). The warrants are usually issued to the following effect:

Below is a list of such warrants in descending order of rank (note: the Orders of Precedence for males and females are separate from one another):

Younger son of a duke

Younger son of a marquess

Younger son of an earl

Younger son of a viscount

Younger son of a baron/lord of Parliament

Daughter of a duke

Daughter of a marquess

Wife of a viscount

Wife of the eldest son of an earl

Daughter of an earl

Wife of a baron

Daughter of a viscount

Wife of the eldest son of a baron

Daughter of a baron/lord of Parliament

Wife of a baronet

Wife of a knight

Notes and references

External links
Royal Warrants of Precedence A similar, incomplete list for 20th-century warrants

Peerages in the United Kingdom